Dmitri Nikolayevich Drevin (born 10 January 1982 in Cheboksary) is a former Olympic gymnast who competed for Russia in the 2000 Olympic Games in Sydney, Australia, winning a bronze medal in the team competition.

See also
 List of Olympic male artistic gymnasts for Russia

External links
 sports-reference.com

1982 births
Living people
Russian male artistic gymnasts
Gymnasts at the 2000 Summer Olympics
Olympic gymnasts of Russia
Olympic bronze medalists for Russia
People from Cheboksary
Olympic medalists in gymnastics
Medalists at the 2000 Summer Olympics
Sportspeople from Chuvashia